Beatriz Ofelia Aguirre Valdez (March 21, 1926 – September 29, 2019) was a Mexican film and television actress. She died on 29 September 2019 at the age of 94.

Filmography

References

Bibliography
 Hardy, Phil. The BFI Companion to Crime. A&C Black, 1997.

External links

1926 births
2019 deaths
Mexican film actresses
Mexican television actresses
Mexican voice actresses
20th-century Mexican actresses
21st-century Mexican actresses
Actresses from Coahuila